Mogoytuysky District (Mogoityn aimag) is an administrative and municipal district (raion) of Agin-Buryat Okrug of Zabaykalsky Krai, Russia, one of the thirty-one in the krai, and borders with Shilkinsky District in the north, Olovyanninsky District in the east, Ononsky District in the south, and with Aginsky District in the west. Its administrative center is the urban locality (an urban-type settlement) of Mogoytuy. Population:  27,386 (2002 Census);  The population of Mogoytuy accounts for 37.3% of the district's total population.

History
The district was established on December 8, 1942.

Gallery 
Landscapes of the Mogoytuy region near the village of Mogoytuy

References

Notes

Sources

Districts of Zabaykalsky Krai
States and territories established in 1942

